The Feldrișel is a right tributary of the river Someșul Mare in Romania. It discharges into the Someșul Mare in Feldru.

References

Rivers of Romania
Rivers of Bistrița-Năsăud County